Two ships of the United States Navy have been named Algol, after a fixed star in the constellation Perseus.

  was an Andromeda-class attack cargo ship that served from World War II until 1970.
 , formerly T-AK-287, is a container ship operated by the Military Sealift Command since 1984.

United States Navy ship names